Sharbot Lake is a suburban community and unincorporated area in the municipality of Central Frontenac, Frontenac County in Eastern Ontario, Canada. Named after the Sharbot family, who were local residents, it appeared in Lovell's Gazetteer in 1874.  It is part of the Land O'Lakes Tourist Region and is located on the eponymous Sharbot Lake.

Recreation
The community is surrounded by many lakes that are used for outdoor recreation. The nearby Sharbot Lake Provincial Park has hiking trails, camp sites, and a boat launch into Sharbot Lake.

Local services
Sharbot Lake has tourist-oriented shops and accommodations. Also in the village are a public beach and park, a pharmacy, grocery, bank, medical clinic, law office, real estate services, and public library (part of the Kingston Frontenac Public Library system). The local post office services the village with lock boxes, and  rural routes (RR2 Sharbot Lake, RR1 Clarendon Station and RR1 Ompah).

Transportation
Sharbot Lake is accessible via Ontario Highway 38 and Ontario Highway 7 (the latter part of the Trans-Canada Highway in the area). It was once an important stop on the Kingston and Pembroke Railway, the rail bed of which has become the  multi-use K&P Rail Trail and part of the Trans Canada Trail.

Annual events
Sharbot Lake hosts:
an annual triathlon, with a 1.5 km swim, 40 km cycle and a 10 km run.
the Arts by The Lake art festival in August
an annual Heritage Festival in February
annual Snowmobile races

Olympic gold medalist Simon Whitfield got his start in the triathlon by participating in Sharbot Lake's annual "Kids Of Steel" event for youth.

References

Other map sources:

External links
 
 Land o'Lakes Tourist Association

Communities in Frontenac County